Mateusz is a Polish given name, equivalent to Hebrew names Matityahu and Matthew, meaning "gift of Yahweh".

List
Notable people with the name include:

B–H
Mateusz Bąk (born 1983), Polish football goalkeeper 
Mateusz Banasiuk (born 1985), Polish actor
Mateusz Bartczak (born 1979), Polish footballer
Mateusz Bartel (born 1985), Polish chess player 
Mateusz Bieniek (born 1994), Polish volleyball player 
Mateusz Biskup (born 1994), Polish rower
Mateusz Borkowski (born 1997), Polish middle-distance runner
Mateusz Broź (born 1988), Polish football midfielder 
Mateusz Cetnarski (born 1988), Polish football midfielder 
Mateusz Chruściński (born 1987), Polish figure skater 
Mateusz Cichocki (born 1992), Polish footballer
Mateusz Cieluch (born 1987), Polish footballer
Mateusz Czunkiewicz (born 1996), Polish volleyball player 
Mateusz Damięcki (born 1981), Polish actor
Mateusz Demczyszak (born 1986), Polish middle-distance runner
Mateusz Didenkow (born 1987), Polish track and field athlete 
Mateusz Dubowski (born 1992), Polish badminton player
Mateusz Garniewicz (born 1980), Polish psychologist and lawyer
Mateusz Gucman (born 1980), Polish freestyle wrestler 
Mateusz Hołownia (born 1998), Polish football defender

J–L
Mateusz Jachlewski (born 1984), Polish handball player 
Mateusz Janik (born 1995), Polish biathlete
Mateusz Jeleń (born 1988), Polish midfielder
Mateusz Kamiński (born 1991), Polish canoeist
Mateusz Kijowski (born 1968), Polish journalist, social activist, and blogger
Mateusz Klich (born 1990), Polish football midfielder 
Mateusz Komar (born 1985), Polish racing cyclist
Mateusz Kornecki (born 1994), Polish handball player
Mateusz Kościukiewicz (born 1986), Polish actor
Mateusz Kossior (16th century), Polish painter and sculptor
Mateusz Kostrzewski (born 1989), Polish basketball player 
Mateusz Kowalczyk (born 1987), Polish tennis player 
Mateusz Kowalski (born 1986), Polish football defender 
Mateusz Kupczak (born 1992), Polish footballer
Mateusz Kus (born 1987), Polish handball player 
Mateusz Kusznierewicz (born 1975), Polish sailor
Mateusz Kwiatkowski (born 1992), Polish football striker 
Mateusz Lewandowski (born 1993), Polish football midfielder 
Mateusz Ligocki (born 1982), Polish snowboarder
Mateusz Lipa (born 1994), Polish racing cyclist 
Mateusz Lis (born 1997), Polish football goaltender 
Mateusz Łuczak (born 1990), Polish football midfielder
Mateusz Luty (born 1990), Polish bobsledder

M–R
Mateusz Machaj (born 1989), Polish footballer
Mateusz Mak (born 1991), Polish footballer
Mateusz Malinowski (born 1992), Polish volleyball player 
Mateusz Masłowski (born 1997), Polish volleyball player 
Mateusz Masternak (born 1987), Polish boxer
Mateusz Matras (born 1991), Polish football centre back
Mateusz Michalski (sprinter) (born 1987) Polish Paralympic sprinter
Mateusz Michalski (swimmer) (born 1988), Polish Paralympic swimmer
Mateusz Mika (born 1991), Polish volleyball player 
Mateusz Molęda (born 1986), German-Polish conductor
Mateusz Morawiecki (born 1968), Polish politician
Mateusz Możdżeń (born 1991), Polish football midfielder 
Mateusz Mróz (born 1980), Polish cyclist
Mateusz Musiałowski (born 2003), Polish footballer
Mateusz Nowaczyk (born 1986), Polish football midfielder 
Mateusz Nowak (born 1992), Polish cyclist
Mateusz Ostaszewski (born 1998), Polish football midfielder 
Mateusz Piątkowski (born 1984), Polish football striker 
Mateusz Piskorski (born 1977), Polish politician and political activist
Mateusz Polaczyk (born 1988), Polish slalom canoeist 
Mateusz Ponitka (born 1993), Polish basketball player 
Mateusz Prus (born 1990), Polish football goalkeeper 
Mateusz Przybylko (born 1992), German high jumper 
Mateusz Rudkowski (c. 1809—c. 1887), Ukrainian-Polish composer of choral and piano music
Mateusz Rudyk (born 1995), Polish track cyclist 
Mateusz Rutkowski (born 1986), Polish ski jumper

S–Z
Mateusz Sawrymowicz (born 1987), Polish swimmer
Mateusz Siebert (born 1989), Polish footballer
Mateusz Sławik (born 1980), Polish football goalkeeper 
Mateusz Słodowy (born 1991), Polish football midfielder 
Mateusz Śmierzchalski (born 1982), Polish heavy metal musician
Mateusz Sochowicz (born 1996), Polish luger
Mateusz Szałek (born 1991), Polish footballer
Mateusz Szczepaniak (footballer) (born 1991), Polish football striker
Mateusz Szczepaniak (speedway rider) (born 1987), Polish speedway rider 
Mateusz Szczurek (born 1975), Polish economist and politician
Mateusz Szwoch (born 1993), Polish football midfielder 
Mateusz Szymorek (born 1993), Polish football defender 
Mateusz Taciak (born 1984), Polish racing cyclist 
Mateusz Taudul (born 1994), Polish football goalkeeper 
Mateusz Urbański (born 1990), Polish football defender 
Mateusz Wdowiak (born 1996), Polish football midfielder 
Mateusz Wieteska (born 1997), Polish football defender 
Mateusz Wilangowski (born 1991), Polish rower
Mateusz Zachara (born 1990), Polish footballer
Mateusz Zaremba (born 1984), Polish handballer
Mateusz Żukowski (born 2001), Polish football player
Mateusz Żyro (born 1998), Polish football player
Mateusz Żytko (born 1982), Polish footballer

Polish masculine given names